Morrisville Public Library is a historic library building located at Morrisville in Madison County, New York.  It was built about 1850 and is a -story frame picturesque cottage with Gothic Revival–style detailing. It became a library in December 1903 with 760 volumes on its shelves.  It was given by Susanna Phelps Gage who wanted to give her family home to the village for something meaningful when her parents Henry and Mary Phelps died.

It was added to the National Register of Historic Places in 2005.

References

External links
Morrisville Public Library website

Libraries on the National Register of Historic Places in New York (state)
Gothic Revival architecture in New York (state)
Houses completed in 1850
National Register of Historic Places in Madison County, New York
Education in Madison County, New York